Abu Hena Mustafa Kamal (11 March 1936 – 23 September 1989) was a Bangladeshi songwriter, poet, essayist, critic and presenter. In his early life, he was a singer on East Bengal radio and television. He was a professor of Bengali literature at the University of Rajshahi and worked for the government as the Director General of the Bangla Academy from 1986 until his death. He was awarded Ekushey Padak by the Government of Bangladesh in 1987. He published only three collections of poetry before he died of a heart attack in 1989.

Early life and education 
Kamal was born in Gobinda village in Ullahpara Upazila, Sirajganj District. In 1959, he passed his MA in Bengali from the University of Dhaka. He received a Commonwealth Scholarship for his PhD on the Bengali Press and Literary Writings, 1818–1831, from the University of London in 1969.

Academic career 
Kamal was appointed as a reader in the Bengali Department at Rajshahi University at the age of 53.

References 

1936 births
1989 deaths
People from Pabna District
Alumni of the University of London
University of Dhaka alumni
Academic staff of the University of Dhaka
Recipients of the Ekushey Padak
Dhaka College alumni